Eli Danker (born 12 October 1948) is an Israeli actor who has appeared in numerous films and television series. He is also known as the father of the Israeli singer-actor Ran Danker.

Career
Danker made his professional television debut on the Israeli comedy program Nikui Rosh, though he quickly established himself as a character actor in both television and film, playing Judas Iscariot in Jesus, and contributing to several Israeli films, including Gabi Ben Yakar and B'Yom Bahir Ro'im et Dameshek.

During the 1980s, Danker guest-starred on a number of American television series, including MacGyver and Mission: Impossible. Starting in 2000, Danker's television appearances increased with guest roles on Nash Bridges, The Agency, Alias, The West Wing, JAG, and The Closer.

Partial filmography

 Jesus (1979) - Judas Iscariot
 Gabi Ben Yakar (1982)
 B'Yom Bahir Ro'im et Dameshek (1984)
 Little Drummer Girl (1984) - Litvak
 Wanted: Dead or Alive (1986) - Robert Aziz
 Bouba (1987) - Eli
 The Taking of Flight 847: The Uli Derickson Story (1988, TV Movie) - Castro
 War and Remembrance (1988, TV Series) - Udam
 MacGyver (1989, TV Series) - Yanif
 Mission: Impossible (1988, TV Series) - Robard
 Impulse (1990) - Dimarjian
 A Gnome Named Gnorm (1990) - Zadar
 Derech Ha'nesher (1990)
 The Mummy Lives (1993) - Museum Director
 Chain of Command (1994) - Col. Hakkim
 Tzedek muchlat (1997)
 Isha Beafor (1997-1999, TV Series)
 Suckers (1999) - Mohammed
 Besame Mucho (2000)
 Nash Bridges (2000, TV Series) - Abraham Lansk
 Ingil (2001)
 The Agency (2002, TV Series) - The Iraqi Intelligence Defector
 Alias (2003, TV Series) - Ahmad Kabir
 Special Forces USA (2003) - Hasib Rafendek
 Air Marshal (2003) - Elijah
 The West Wing (2004, TV Series) - Israeli Defense Minister Doran Mazar
 JAG (2005, TV Series) - Judge Haji Shareef
 CSI: Miami (2005, TV Series) - Richard Thomason
 The Cutter (2005) - Professor Abrams
 Undisputed II: Last Man Standing (2006) - Crot
 The Closer (2006, TV Series) - Abdul al-Fulani
 Alufa, Ha- (2006-2007, TV Series) - Itzik Zelig
 My Mom's New Boyfriend (aka My Spy) (2008) - Jean Yves Tatao
 Viktor (2014) - Souliman
 24 Legacy (2017, TV Series) - Ibraham Bin-Khalid
 Family (2017) - Dad
 First We Take Brooklyn (2018) - Dudu

References

External links
 
 Reference page devoted to Danker, giving film, movie, and television credits

1948 births
Israeli Ashkenazi Jews
Israeli male film actors
Israeli male television actors
Israeli people of Lithuanian-Jewish descent
Living people
Place of birth missing (living people)